Walter McFarlane Coulter MC (1891 – 20 May 1917) was a Scottish amateur footballer who played in the Scottish League for Queen's Park as a right half.

Personal life 
Coulter grew up the son of a sugarcane planter in the Danish West Indies and was sent to live in Scotland in 1894. He was educated at Thornliebank School, the High School of Glasgow and the Royal College of Science and Technology. After leaving school, Coulter served an engineering apprenticeship and prior to the First World War, he worked in the drawing office at Fairfield Shipyard. By spring 1915, half a year after the outbreak of the First World War, Coulter had enlisted in the Highland Light Infantry. He was commissioned as a temporary second lieutenant on 28 September 1915 and was awarded the Military Cross for actions on 7 February 1917:

Captain Coulter was killed in an attack on Croisilles on 20 May 1917. He is commemorated on the Arras Memorial.

Career statistics

References 

Scottish footballers
1917 deaths
British Army personnel of World War I
British military personnel killed in World War I
1891 births
Highland Light Infantry officers
Scottish Football League players
Association football wing halves
Queen's Park F.C. players
Recipients of the Military Cross
People from the Danish West Indies
People educated at the High School of Glasgow
Alumni of the University of Strathclyde